State Road 19 (NM 19) is a state highway in the US state of New Mexico. NM 19's western terminus is at NM 209 in Clovis, and the eastern terminus is at FM 2013.

History
Before 1940 it was originally part of NM 2 then later U.S. Route 285 (US 285). It was renamed NM 19 in 1940 when US 285 was rerouted through Tres Piedras. Then in the 1950s it was renamed NM 17 to match Colorado State Highway 17 (SH 17).
 

State Road 40 (NM 40) was first established in the 1920s as a road from Weed eastward to Dunken. This was removed from the state highway system in the 1930s. This road still exists as forest roads.

Later in the 1950s, NM 40 was used for a highway from Broadview eastward to Hollene. In 1970 NM 40 was renumbered as NM 19 around 1970 to avoid confusion with Interstate 40 (I-40).

Major intersections

See also

References

019
Transportation in Curry County, New Mexico